Persatuan Sepakbola Indonesia Wamena, commonly known as Persiwa Wamena  is an Indonesian football club based in Wamena, Papua, Indonesia. They play in the Liga 3.

History 
Although they became the runners-up in the 2014 Liga Indonesia Premier Division and got promoted, they were disqualified because they did not qualify during the verification process for the 2015 Indonesia Super League. They then decided to accept the offer from PT Liga to play again in the Liga Indonesia Premier Division.

Kit suppliers 
 Lotto (2009–2011)
 Umbro (2011–2014)
 VELDOME sport (2014–now)

References 

 
Football clubs in Indonesia
Football clubs in Highland Papua
1925 establishments in the Dutch East Indies
Association football clubs established in 1925